Eastern Punjabi may refer to:

the standard form of the Punjabi language as used in India (rather than Pakistan)
the eastern Punjabi dialects spoken in both India and Pakistan

See also
 Eastern Punjab (disambiguation)